Plasmodium cephalophi is a parasite of the genus Plasmodium subgenus Vinckeia. As in all Plasmodium species, P. cephalophi has both vertebrate and insect hosts. The vertebrate hosts for this parasite are mammals.

Taxonomy 
The parasite was first described by Bruce et al. in 1913.

Description
The schizonts give rise to 8-12 merozoites. Mature merozoites measure 10 x 10 micrometres.

The merozoites are large measuring 3.5 by 4.0 micrometres.

The gametocytes are round and possess a number of darkly staining granules.

The infected erythrocytes are pale.

Distribution 
This species was described in Malawi.

Hosts 
The parasite was found in the blood of two antelopes (Cephalophus grimmi).

It is also known to infect the grey duiker (Sylvicapra grimmia)

References 

cephalophi